Gramë Lake is a glacial lake situated in the eastern Korab Mountains, close to the Mount Korab and Mali i Gramës in Albania, spanning an area of . It is also the largest and deepest lake within the mountain range. The lake is located 1,750 metres elevation above sea level. Their shores are steep and rocky. It takes water from rainfall, and snowfall. The biggest amount of water can be observed in the late spring, which is due to melting of the snow on the surrounding peaks.

See also 
 Korab-Koritnik Nature Park
 Geography of Albania
 Lakes of Albania

References 

Lakes of Albania